Park Jung-hyun (4 November 1964) is a South Korean politician serving as Mayor of Daedeok District of Daejeon and Daejeon's first woman district mayor from July 2018.

Before entering politics in 2010, Park had worked at environmental organisations most notably as Green Korea United's deputy secretary general from 2008 after Kim Je-nam and its Daejeon-Chungnam branch's secretary general from 1997.

In the 2010 election, Park was placed as the top of the proportional list of her party. In 2011 she resigned from vice-chair of Industry and Construction Committee of Daejeon Metropolitan Council over issuing Municipal bond to fund the construction of accommodation for Daejeon Hana Citizen, a football club owned by the City.

In the 2014 election, Park was re-elected. Since then, she took multiple roles in her party such as vice chair of its Women's Committee, vice chair of its Special Committee on Fine Dust and co-spokesperson of Moon Jae-in's second presidential campaign in Daejeon.

In the 2018 election, Park defeated the incumbent Daedeok Mayor from opposition party becoming the first woman mayor of any of 5 districts in Daejeon. She is also the first mayor of Daedeok not from now-United Future Party or its preceding parties in 12 years.

Park holds LLB from Chungnam National University.

Electoral history

References 

1964 births
Living people
Mayors of places in South Korea
Minjoo Party of Korea politicians
South Korean women in politics
South Korean environmentalists
Daedeok District